Godmanchester railway station was a railway station situated in the town of Godmanchester in Huntingdonshire, England. It was situated on the Huntingdon to St Ives line.

History
The station was built by the Ely and Huntingdon Railway (E&HR), and opened on 19 August 1847; it was originally named Huntingdon. Prior to opening, the E&HR amalgamated with the Lynn and Dereham Railway and the Lynn and Ely Railway to form the East Anglian Railway (EAR). The EAR was absorbed by the Great Eastern Railway (GER) in 1862. The line and station were transferred to the Great Northern and Great Eastern Joint Railway (GN&GEJR) in 1879, and on 1 July 1882, the station was renamed Godmanchester. The GN&GEJR became part of the London and North Eastern Railway when that company was created in the 1923 Grouping by amalgamation of the GER with several other railways.

The station closed to passengers on 15 June 1959 and to freight on 4 June 1962. It has since been demolished.

References

External links 
 Godmanchester station on navigable 1946 O. S. map
 Godmanchester station on Subterranea Britannica

Disused railway stations in Cambridgeshire
Former Great Northern and Great Eastern Joint Railway stations
Railway stations in Great Britain opened in 1847
Railway stations in Great Britain closed in 1959
1847 establishments in England
Godmanchester